Miodrag Mitrović (born 14 July 1991) is a Swiss professional footballer who plays as a goalkeeper for Chiasso. He is from Bosnian Serb descent.

Honours
Universitatea Craiova
Cupa României: 2017–18

References

External links
 
 

1991 births
Living people
Swiss men's footballers
Switzerland youth international footballers
Association football goalkeepers
FC Lugano players
FC Locarno players
FC Chiasso players
S.S.C. Bari players
NK Krka players
CS Universitatea Craiova players
PFC Cherno More Varna players
Swiss Challenge League players
Swiss 1. Liga (football) players
Serie B players
Slovenian PrvaLiga players
2. Liga Interregional players
Liga I players
First Professional Football League (Bulgaria) players
Swiss Promotion League players
Swiss expatriate footballers
Swiss expatriate sportspeople in Italy
Expatriate footballers in Italy
Swiss expatriate sportspeople in Romania
Expatriate footballers in Romania
Swiss expatriate sportspeople in Slovenia
Expatriate footballers in Slovenia
Swiss expatriate sportspeople in Bulgaria
Expatriate footballers in Bulgaria
Swiss people of Serbian descent
People from Bellinzona
Sportspeople from Ticino